Seyran Osipov (born 4 December 1961; died 13 January 2008 of heart failure) was a Russian professional footballer of Armenian origin.

Club career
He made his professional debut in the Soviet Second League in 1979 for FC Mashuk Pyatigorsk.

References

1961 births
People from Hrazdan
Russian people of Armenian descent
2008 deaths
Soviet footballers
Russian footballers
Association football forwards
FC Dynamo Stavropol players
FC Ararat Yerevan players
FC Hebar Pazardzhik players
Homenmen Beirut players
Soviet Top League players
First Professional Football League (Bulgaria) players
Russian Premier League players
Lebanese Premier League players
Soviet expatriate footballers
Russian expatriate footballers
Expatriate footballers in Bulgaria
Expatriate footballers in Lebanon
Russian expatriate sportspeople in Bulgaria
Russian expatriate sportspeople in Lebanon
FC Mashuk-KMV Pyatigorsk players
Ethnic Armenian sportspeople